Bucknall-Estcourt is a surname. Notable people with the surname include:

James Bucknall Bucknall Estcourt (1803–1855), English major general and MP
Thomas Bucknall-Estcourt (1801–1876), British politician

Compound surnames